Bob Austin was a former Australian professional soccer player who last played as a goalkeeper for Cessnock and the Australia national soccer team.

Club career
Austin began his senior career with Weston in 1914. He played in the 1917 finals series, where he was involved in a violent pitch invasion when playing against Weston Magpies. In September 1919, he played until the semi-final for Weston in the Gardiner Cup 1919. Until his end at Weston, he won two league Premierships, one league Championship and one cup win.

International career
Gilmore began his international career with Australia in June 1923 on their second historic tour against New Zealand, debuting in a 2–3 loss to New Zealand scoring his first goal on debut.

Career statistics

International

References

Australian soccer players
Association football goalkeepers
Australia international soccer players